The Bombardment of Greytown or the Bombardment of San Juan del Norte was a naval action initiated by the United States sloop-of-war USS Cyane, commanded by George N. Hollins, against the town of Greytown in the Miskito Kingdom, which was under British protection. The town was completely destroyed.

Prelude 
The 13 July 1854 attack was in response to attempts by the British government to charge taxes and duties through its protectorate on the ships that were using it as a port to access Commodore Vanderbilt's Nicaragua Route to California. Other reasons were for attacks which destroyed the headquarters of an American company at Punta Arenas, a Nicaraguan area claimed by the Miskito Kingdom, and the assault and temporary kidnapping of the American Minister to Central America, Solon Borland, at the US consulate. Borland had been accused of preventing the arrest of a US citizen charged with the death of a local resident.

US assault 
The USS Cyane was dispatched by the Department of State to demand satisfaction. Hollins instructions were vague, if not contradictory. There were no local authorities to fulfil the US demands, since all the members of Greytown Council had resigned right after the Borland's affair. Only the British consul protested when in the morning of 12 July, Captain Hollins gave the town a 12-hour deadline to abide to the US request or be shelled by the sloop's artillery. The bombardment began the next morning at 9.30 am. The three-gun British schooner HMS Bermuda was moored at harbour, commanded by Lieutenant W. D. Jolley, who only essayed a half-hearted complaint, dismissed by Hollins, whose ship carried 18 32-pounder guns and 4 24-pounders. Jolley's justification for his lack of action was that the force under his command was "so totally inadequate against the Cyane, that I can only enter this my protest." Although the town was badly hit by Cyane's salvos, the massive fire was set up by a number of U.S. Marines who landed at the port. Despite widespread destruction, there were no casualties.

Aftermath 
British involvement in the Crimean War, together with the firm opposition of Britain's merchant class to a war with the United States, prevented any further diplomatic or military reaction from Britain. Despite international outrage at the bombardment of the town, the United States refused to apologise for any damage or loss of life incurred, instead opting to avoid discussion of the incident until President Franklin Pierce finally gave an official position, six months later:

After giving a somewhat detailed and biased account of the bombardment, the president concluded that while it would have been more satisfactory if the Cyane's mission could have been consummated without the use of force, "the arrogant contumacy of the offenders rendered it impossible to avoid the alternative either to break up their establishment or to leave them impressed with the idea that they might persevere with impunity in a career of insolence and plunder."

References
Notes

Bibliography

 Linder, Bruce, "Intertwined Heritage," Naval History magazine (October 2007) - The role of the USS Cyane in first laying claim to San Diego

 Folkman, D. (1972). The Nicaragua Route. University of Utah Press.

Naval battles involving the United States
Conflicts in 1854
United Kingdom–United States relations
Naval battles involving the United Kingdom
Battles and conflicts without fatalities
July 1854 events